The 1971 Balkans Cup was an edition of the Balkans Cup, a football competition for representative clubs from the Balkan states. It was contested by 6 teams and Panionios won the trophy.

Group A

Group B

Finals

First leg

Second leg

Panionios won 3–2 on aggregate.

References

External links

RSSSF Archive → Balkans Cup

Mehmet Çelik. "Balkan Cup". Turkish Soccer

1971
1970–71 in European football
1971–72 in European football
1970–71 in Romanian football
1971–72 in Romanian football
1970–71 in Greek football
1971–72 in Greek football
1970–71 in Bulgarian football
1971–72 in Bulgarian football
1970–71 in Turkish football
1971–72 in Turkish football
1970–71 in Yugoslav football
1971–72 in Yugoslav football
1970–71 in Albanian football
1971–72 in Albanian football